An essay is a short piece of writing.

Essay may also refer to:

Essay (numismatics), a prototype of a proposed coin
Essay (philately), a prototype of a proposed stamp
Essay, Orne, a town in France